Veterans Memorial Park may refer to:

 Veterans Memorial Park (New Castle, Delaware)
 Veterans Memorial Park (Boise, Idaho)
 Veterans Memorial Park (Davenport, Iowa)
 Veterans Memorial Park (Bay City, Michigan)
 Veterans Memorial Park (St. Louis), Missouri, a park in Greater St. Louis
 Veterans Memorial Park (Moore, Oklahoma)
 Veterans Memorial Park (Auburn, New York)
 Veterans Memorial Park (Beaverton, Oregon)
 Eagle Field at Veterans Memorial Park, Harrisonburg, Virginia
 Klamath Falls Veterans Memorial Park, Klamath Falls, Oregon
 Little Falls Veterans Memorial Park, Little Falls, New York
 Seekonk Veterans Memorial Park, Seekonk, Massachusetts
 Vietnam Veterans Memorial State Park, Angel Fire, New Mexico
 Veterans Memorial Community Regional Park, Sylmar, Los Angeles, California

See also 
 Veterans Park (disambiguation)